Jack M. Ducker (years flourished 1910–1930) was a European painter (possibly of Scottish origin) who specialized in Scottish highland landscapes.

Although most of the artist's documented works are undated they are thought to have been created from about 1910 through 1930, with at least one oil on canvas attributed to the late 19th century by Christie's auction house.  Little is known about Ducker personally, though dozens of the artist's works have been sold at auction (including sales at Bonhams and Christie's, in addition to a number of other auction houses).  Ducker is interchangeably known in art-reference sources as J. Ducker, J. M. Ducker, Jack Ducker, and Jack M. Ducker, and possibly as John or James Ducker.

Artwork 

Ducker's Barbizon- and British-influenced landscapes emphasize various qualities of the Scottish and British countrysides. Many of the painter's documented artworks feature a muddy, earthy color palette with emphasis on the atmospheric and rusty color spectrum that the Scottish highland mountains provide. Ducker's scenes are frequently idyllic and evoke a similar compositional structure. Rocky mountains are often a focal point, with additional emphasis on other natural objects such as gnarled leafy trees, short shrubs, tall green grasses, and placid lakes and ponds.

On occasion Ducker includes wildfowl and grazing animals, such as sheep, and the farmers who tend them. Much of Ducker's documented brushwork is moderately tight with carefully controlled minute details applied with a fine brush or like instrument.  Within the documented paintings, Ducker tends to sign in the lower left or right corners of the canvas with the signature "JMDucker" or "JDucker" – occasionally underlining the surname.

Alternative artist name 
There is no mention above of using online family history resources to research Jack. M. Ducker. An attempt to find 'Jack Ducker' or 'John Ducker' working as an artist in the Census Returns of England and Wales 1911 during 2022 proved fruitless. There is however an artist named Jacob Maurice Ducker who was living at 2 Stanley Buildings, Pancras Road, Kings Cross, London in that census. Further research shows him as an artist in the 1921 census, and in 1929 at the marriage of his step-son. This research is documented in Jacob Maurice Ducker's profile at WikiTree.

See also

List of painters by name
List of Scottish artists

References

Year of birth missing
Place of birth missing
Year of death missing
Place of death missing
19th-century births
19th-century Scottish painters
Scottish male painters
19th-century Scottish people
20th-century deaths
20th-century Scottish painters
20th-century Scottish people
Scottish landscape painters
19th-century Scottish male artists
20th-century Scottish male artists